True Volunteer Foundation is part of a UK registered charity which provides funding for charitable projects to improve the lives of children worldwide. This is achieved through a combination of fundraising events, corporate sponsorship and individual donations.

Lifecycle Fundraising originally held charity number 1113789.  It was incorporated on 20 January 2005 and changed its name to True Volunteer Foundation on 1 May 2008.

Lifecycle is now one of 5 charity brands actively promoted by True Volunteer.

The recorded income of all brands in True Volunteer Foundation is very small, falling from £7,291 in 2007 to £2,181 in 2008.  The charity commission does not require accounts for this charity.

True Volunteer states that its annual operating costs are approximately £1000 and include audit fees.  In 2008, therefore, its administrative costs would appear to consume nearly 50% of its income of £2181.  Despite this, Lifecycle alone says it has benefited over 30,000 children in 2008.

History 
True Volunteer Foundation was founded by Michael Padmanathan in late 2004, with the idea of giving something back to the community. It started out as a series of informal fundraising events among a network of friends and acquaintances, but has since expanded to organising both corporate and private fundraising activities on a substantial scale.

During 2005, True Volunteer Foundation became a UK registered limited company, an organisational member of the Institute of Fundraising
 and a member of the National Council for Voluntary Organisations. The main highlight of 2005 was the Fundraising Ball in April, which attracted 300 guests and raised in excess of £25,000. This was used to fund the construction of a children's home and three nursery schools in Sri Lanka.

In the first quarter of 2006, True Volunteer Foundation expanded its operations to include new corporate social responsibility and private wealth management programmes. True Volunteer Foundation has recently become a registered charity in the United Kingdom and was registered with the Charity Commission for England and Wales on 19 April 2006.
Now Lifecycle has become part of a larger organisation which is called True volunteer Foundation. It has charitable status, and so has become a fundraising organisation that is "feeding" itself. That is to say it is now a charity supporting itself and "partner" charities, and seems to have positioned itself as if it had a large charity status. Its web site claims support from the Royal Family and sporting personalities, and although it may be doing good works in many countries, seems to apply exaggeration and spin. True Volunteer Foundation is also split into five other categories including Greencycle, Lifecycle, and other "cycles" and "Charity Levels", incorporating very diverse objectives, as yet not apparent on the Charity Commission web pages.

Activities 
LIFECYCLE Fundraising is a fundraising organisation dedicated to working with children's charities, which enables individual and corporate members to organise fundraising events of their choosing and to specify how and where the funds will be allocated. LIFECYCLE provides services such as sponsorship forms, web space and ticketing facilities, as well as promoting these events among its members.

LIFECYCLE does not charge for its services and offers a commitment that "no commissions, wages or admin costs are deducted from the donations received."

Successes 
LIFECYCLE's focus in 2005 was on the areas most affected by the Tsunami disaster, particularly in the country of Sri Lanka. Through a combination of fundraising events and donations from members, LIFECYCLE was able to provide funding for various projects, including:

the construction of a children's home in eastern Sri Lanka, in partnership with Arobanam Children's Fund
the production of an English teaching pack, in partnership with Volunteers for English in Sri Lanka
the servicing of 12 solar powered radios for radio listener groups in Madagascar, through the Dodwell Trust

In 2006, as well as continuing to fund reconstruction efforts in Sri Lanka, LIFECYCLE is expanding its operations with new projects in countries to include Bulgaria, Nepal, India and Madagascar. LIFECYCLE has completed the following projects in the first quarter of 2006:

provision of two new wells, a pharmacy and five latrines in Madagascar, in partnership with AZAFADY
a successful, life-saving heart operation for a girl of 16 months in Sri Lanka, in partnership with the SHIVA Charity

Registrations and affiliations 

LIFECYCLE is a not-for-profit limited company registered in the United Kingdom, with company registration number 5338347. 
LIFECYCLE is a UK registered charity, with registered charity number 1113789.
LIFECYCLE is an organisational member of the Institute of Fundraising, registration number Z62539.
LIFECYCLE is also a member of the National Council for Voluntary Organisations, number 6566.

Notes and references

External links
LIFECYCLE Fundraising web page

Children's charities based in the United Kingdom
Health charities in the United Kingdom